Morning star is a 1959 Soviet ballet film directed by Roman Tikhomirov, based on a folk tale, and featuring the Kyrgyz State Academic Opera and Ballet Theater.

Synopsis 
An evil witch, Ai Dai, using magic, switches bodies with a beautiful young woman, Cholpon, and uses her new form to seduce the young prince Nurdfin.

Cast 

 Reina Chokoyeva as Cholpon
 Uran Sarbagishev as Nurdfin
 Nurdin Tugelov as Temir Khan
 Bubusara Beyshenalieva as Ai-Dai
 Sapar Abduzhalilov as Genie

Reception 
Upon the film's release in the United States in 1962, the New York Times wrote of it positively, saying:

“As a co-production of the Leningrad and Frunze Film Studios, the picture certainly moves [...]. The dancers go to town, and for once (on screen, anyway) a ballet heroine, Reina Chokoyeva, conveys real terror. But the incredibly mercurial Bibisara Beishenalieva, as the sorcerer, goes the whole company one better by suggesting that she's about to take off into space.”

External links 
 Morning star [IMDB]

References 

1959 films
Ballet films
Soviet ballet films